Farukh Haji Kasam Choudhary (born 8 November 1996) is an Indian professional footballer who plays as a forward for Indian Super League club Jamshedpur.

Career

Early career and Lonestar Kashmir 
Encouraged by his father to take on football, Choudhary started his career with centre back and the Maharashtra state youth teams. Choudhary then joined the academy of I-League side, Pune. He then joined Lonestar Kashmir for their I-League 2nd Division campaign in which he scored six goals in 18 matches.

Kerala Blasters
After his impressive performance for Lonestar Kashmir, Choudhary signed for Jamshedpur FC of the Indian Super League. He made his professional debut with the club on 5 October 2016 against Atlético de Kolkata. He started the match and played 68 minutes as Mumbai City FC lost 1–0.

Mumbai (loan)
After the 2016 ISL season, Choudhary was loaned to I-League side Mumbai. He made his debut for the club on 8 January 2017 in their opening match of the season against DSK Shivajians. He started and played 56 minutes as Mumbai won 1–0.

Jamshedpur
On 23 July 2017, Choudhary was selected in the 11th round of the 2017–18 ISL Players Draft by Jamshedpur for the 2017–18 Indian Super League season.  He made his debut for the club during the first ever match on 18 November 2017 against NorthEast United. He came as a 69th-minute substitute for Mehtab Hossain as Jamshedpur drew 0–0.

Career statistics

Club

International

International goals
Scores and results list India's goal tally first

Honours 

India
 SAFF Championship: 2021; runner-up: 2018
 King's Cup third place: 2019

Jamshedpur
Indian Super League Premiers: 2021-22

References

External links 
 Indian Super League Profile.
 Jamshedpur FC Profile.

1996 births
Living people
People from Thane district
Footballers from Maharashtra
Indian footballers
Lonestar Kashmir F.C. players
Kerala Blasters FC players
Mumbai FC players
Jamshedpur FC players
Association football forwards
I-League 2nd Division players
Indian Super League players
I-League players
India international footballers
Pune FC players